Lactalis is a French multinational dairy products corporation, owned by the Besnier family and based in Laval, Mayenne, France. The company's former name was Besnier SA.

Lactalis is the largest dairy products group in the world, and is the second largest food products group in France, behind Danone. It owns brands such as Parmalat, Président, Siggi's Dairy, Skånemejerier, Rachel's Organic, and Stonyfield Farm.

History

André Besnier started a small cheesemaking company in 1933 and launched its Président brand of Camembert in 1968. In 1990, it acquired Group Bridel (2,300 employees, 10 factories, fourth-largest French dairy group) with a presence in 60 countries. In 1992, it acquired United States cheese company Sorrento. In 1999, la société Besnier became le groupe Lactalis owned by Belgian holding company BSA International SA. In 2006, they bought Italian group Galbani, and in 2008, bought Swiss cheesemaker Baer. They bought Italian group Parmalat in a 2011 2.5B € takeover after its bankruptcy and have since sought to delist it. In 2013, the Sorrento and Precious brands in the US were renamed Galbani, and the Sorrento Lactalis division was renamed Lactalis American Group.

In 2007, the French Institut National des Appellations d'Origine, which administers AOC (L'appellation d'origine contrôlée) designations for French food products, refused to permit Lactalis and the dairy cooperative, Isigny-Sainte-Mère, to sell pasteurized Camembert as "true Camembert". As of 2007, these two companies represented between 80 and 90% of Normandy Camembert sales. In 2018, the INAO announced it would relax restrictions and create a new designation to include pasteurized Camembert in 2021.

Lactilis acquired the southern Swedish dairy company, Skånemejerier, in February 2012.

In May 2015, Lactalis acquired an 80% stake in Turkish dairy Ak Gida, a subsidiary of Yildiz Holding.

In July 2017 it was announced that Groupe Danone had agreed to sell its Stonyfield Farm subsidiary to Lactalis for $875 Million to avoid anti-trust claims and to clear the way for Danone's acquisition of U.S. organic food producer WhiteWave Foods.

In December 2017, Lactalis announced the acquisition of dairy company Itambé.

In January 2018, Lactalis announced it had agreed to purchase the skyr producer Siggi's Dairy, which will continue to be run independently.

In October 2018, Lactalis announced the acquisition of Nestlé Malaysia's chilled dairy business unit for approximately $40 million.

Lactalis's Indian subsidiary Tirumala Milk Products said that it would acquire Prabhat's dairy business for ₹17 Billion. This will be Lactalis's third acquisition in India.

On 15 September 2020, Groupe Lactalis announced an agreement to acquire Kraft Heinz's natural cheese operations in North America and internationally for $3.2 billion. The Department of Justice ruled that Lactalis must divest the Athenos and Polly-O cheese brands.

Operations
Owned by the Belgian holding company BSA International SA, which is controlled by the Besnier family that founded Lactalis, Lactalis in 2015 had global revenues of 16.5 billion euros. Lactalis employs 75,000 people worldwide, at 237 production sites in 43 countries. The headquarters for Lactalis American Group, Inc. is located in Buffalo, New York.

Controversies

In August 2016, farmers blockaded the company HQ in the French city of Laval, protesting what they saw as price fixing.

In January 2018, the company had to withdraw 12 million boxes of baby formula due to a salmonella contamination. They were accused of trying to hide the initial discovery of contamination, which led to the crisis.

In 2020 allegations were made that 38 of Lactalis's production plants in France had breached environmental regulations, and had been doing so for a number of years. Lactalis stated it had invested €60 million in improving wastewater treatment plants.

Brands

The group operates in eight divisions:
Lactalis cheeses with President – Rouy  Lepetit  Bridélight  Galbani  Rondelé  Munster's Little Friends
Lactalis Butter & Creams with President – Bridélice  Bridélight  Primrose
Lactel with Awakening – Day after day  Morning Light
Lactalis AOC with Pochat – Istara  Beulet  Salakis  Lanquetot  Roquefort Société  Golden Ball  Lou Pérac  The Ruby  Raguin  The Stone Bridge
Lactalis consumption AFH with President – Society  Bridel  Locatelli
Lactalis industry with BBA – Calciane  Prolacta
Tendriade Veal with Tendriade – Eurovo  Voréal
Lactalis International with President – Sorrento  Valbreso  Galbani  Sorrento  Locatelli  Invernizzi
LNUF with The Milkmaid – Yoco  Flanby  Sveltesse  Vienna  Greek Yogurt  Kremly  BA  Fold

Lactalis owns 198 industrial sites in 55 countries including the US, Romania, Poland, Italy, Russia, Ukraine, Spain, Saudi Arabia, Egypt, Ireland, Portugal, Switzerland, Croatia, Czech Republic, Georgia ("სანტე" brand), United Kingdom, Australia and as of 2011, Canada and South Africa. Lactalis mostly produces yogurt, butter, cheese, powdered milk, baby formula and milk drinks.

See also

 List of cheesemakers
 List of companies of France

References

External links
 

 
Dairy products companies of France
Cheesemakers
Multinational dairy companies
Multinational food companies
Multinational companies headquartered in France
Conglomerate companies of France
Mayenne
Food and drink companies established in 1933
Conglomerate companies established in 1933
French companies established in 1933
Besnier family
French brands
Companies based in Pays de la Loire